The "National Anthem of Honduras" was adopted by presidential decree 42 in 1915. The lyrics were written by Augusto Constantino Coello and the music composed by Carlos Hartling.

Unofficially, the anthem is sometimes called "" ("Your flag is a splendour of sky"), which is in the first line of the chorus.

History 
Between independence from Spain in 1821 and 1915, Honduras did not have an official national anthem and used various unofficial anthems such as "" (by Rómulo E. Durón), "", "" (of unknown authorship), "" (by Valentín Durón), " Gerardo Barrios" (by Belgian author Coussin, used during the presidency of José María Medina) and the "".

In 1904, a group of intellectuals proposed to President Manuel Bonilla a competition to find a national anthem, but a competition was not held until 1910 with Decree No. 115, during the presidency of Miguel Rafael Dávila Cuéllar, at the initiative of deputies Rómulo E. Durón and Ramón Valladares. This competition was declared void in 1912, because the ten works presented did not meet the requirements.

The competition was won by a poem titled "" or "", by writer Augusto C. Coello. German-born composer Carlos Hartling was commissioned to compose the music for the anthem, which he did in 1903, although he had previously written scores for the anthem while lyrics were not available.

The anthem was made official on 13 November 1915 with Decree No. 42 by President , which was published in Gazette No. 4 529 of 15 January 1916 and approved by decree number 34 of 23 January 1917. An official explanation of the anthem by Gualberto Cantarero Palacios was later published by the Ministry of Public Education.

Lyrics
In its entirety, the anthem is a brief chronology of Honduran history. The anthem consists of the chorus and seven verses. For official functions and school exercises, only the chorus and seventh verse are sung, which was ordered in the late 1920s by minister Presentacion Centeno during the presidency of Miguel Paz Barahona.

The chorus, which is sung before and after the seventh verse, is a description of Honduras's chief national symbols, the flag and the coat of arms. The seventh verse is a patriotic call to duty to Hondurans to defend the flag and the nation.

By the time Hondurans complete their sixth year of elementary education, they will have memorised and been taught the meaning of the chorus and all seven stanzas. For graduations in middle school, high school, university or another type of graduation, an exam will be done based on a questionnaire of the National Anthem.

Short version

Full lyrics

See also 
 Flag of Honduras
 Coat of arms of Honduras

Notes

References

External links
 Honduras: Himno Nacional de Honduras - Audio of the national anthem of Honduras, with information and lyrics (archive link)

Honduras
National symbols of Honduras
Spanish-language songs
1915 in Honduras
Honduran music
National anthems
National anthem compositions in D major
National anthem compositions in G major